The following are the records of Jordan in Olympic weightlifting. Records are maintained in each weight class for the snatch lift, clean and jerk lift, and the total for both lifts by the Jordanian Weightlifting Federation.

Men

Women

References

External links

records
Jordan
Olympic weightlifting
weightlifting